Pageant of Steam is an annual steam fair held on Gehan Road in Canandaigua, New York (Town of Hopewell). It started in 1960 and is hosted by the New York Steam Engine Association.

The pageant is held the second full weekend of August, starting on Wednesday and continuing through Saturday. Besides steam engines, it features an antique tractor pull and a large flea market. Due to the nearby Empire Farm Days event in Seneca Falls, held from Tuesday until Thursday, some of the flea market vendors and many  visitors attend the Steam Pageant on Friday and Saturday.

Until 1971, when  were purchased on Gehan Road off State Route 5 and US 20  East of the City of Canandaigua, the event was held at various places, including the old site of Roseland Waterpark.

References

Roseland Amusement park on Canandaigua lake.

External links
https://nysteamengineassociation.com/pageant-of-steam/

Steam festivals
Festivals in New York (state)
Tourist attractions in Ontario County, New York
Recurring events established in 1960
1960 establishments in New York (state)